Amid dictionary is a two volume dictionary of Persian language, written by Hasan Amid.

The dictionary was first published in 1963. Hasan Amid had previously published a dictionary titled Farhang-e No (lit. New Dictionary) in 1954, but the most complete dictionary published by him is Amid Dictionary (1963). It was republished in 2010 under the supervision of Farhad Ghorbanzadeh, who is a member of Dehkhoda Dictionary Institute.

References
Persian Wikipedia article

1963 non-fiction books
Persian dictionaries
Iranian books